Karl Peter Wildoer is a Swedish musician who is the drummer for Darkane, Electrocution 250 and Grimmark. He has also drummed for the bands Armageddon, Majestic, Pestilence, Silver Seraph, Arch Enemy, Time Requiem, Soilwork, Gardens of Obscurity and Dawn of Oblivion amongst others. He has been tagged to perform sessions drums on Old Man's Child's latest album, Slaves of the World. He is the drummer/harsh vocalist of the James LaBrie solo records Static Impulse and Impermanent Resonance. He also joined the experimental metal trio Electrocution 250 along with Todd Duane and Lalle Larsson, with which released the album Cartoon Music from Hell.

He received his first drumset when he was 7. When he was nine he started to play the flute at the local music school (Kommunala musikskolan) where he learned how to read sheet music.  After a year of playing the flute he quit and decided to take drum lessons instead.  In 1986 he joined a brass band. He stayed with this band for 8 years. At the age of 14 he created his first rock band named "Dammer", which was later changed to "Zaninez".  In 1989 Christopher Malmström joined the band Zaninez and he and Peter became friends. This friendship would later help to form Darkane.

He also auditioned for Dream Theater in 2010. He competed along with 6 others, who the band called "the worlds greatest drummers". The band was openly impressed with his audition, going as far as to name him in their Top 3 favorites, along with Mike Mangini (who was hired as the band's new drummer), Virgil Donati, Aquiles Priester, Derek Roddy, Thomas Lang and Marco Minnemann.

Credits
Drum technician
 Colony - In Flames

Record producer
 Sworn to a Great Divide - Soilwork

Albums

Agretator
 Delusions (1993)
 Kompakt Kraft (1994)
 Distorted Logic (1996)

Armageddon
 Crossing The Rubicon (1997)

Arch Enemy
 Stigmata (1998)

Darkane
 Rusted Angel (1999)
 Insanity (2001)
 Expanding Senses (2002)
 Layers of Lies (2005)
 Demonic Art (2008)
 The Sinister Supremacy (2013)
 Inhuman Spirits (2022)

Majestic
 Trinity Overture (2000)

Silver Seraph
 Silver Seraph (2001)

Time Requiem
 Time Requiem (2002)
 Unleased In Japan (2004)

Electrocution 250
 Electric Cartoon Music From Hell (2004)

Non-Human Level
(On vocals)
 Non-Human Level (2005)

Rusty Flores
 Rusty Flores (2006)
 New Leaf vs. Violent White (2007)

Grimmark
 Grimmark (2007)

The Stefan Rosqvist Band
 Guitar Diaries (2008)

Pestilence
 Resurrection Macabre (2009)

Old Man's Child
 Slaves of the World (2009)

James LaBrie
(Drums, vocals)
 Static Impulse (2010)
 Impermanent Resonance (2013)

References

External links
 The Official Peter Wildoer website
 Official YouTube channel
 Official Facebook page

1974 births
Living people
Death metal musicians
Swedish heavy metal drummers
Arch Enemy members
Pestilence (band) members
Darkane members
21st-century drummers
Old Man's Child members